An olor is a piece of cowhide or plastic tied onto a male goat like a skirt.  It is used by Kenyan goatherders to prevent bucks from impregnating the female goats during times of drought.

References

External links

Society of Kenya
Contraception for males
Reproduction in animals
Goats
Agriculture in Kenya
Pastoralists